In the Russian Empire, inorodtsy (singular: inorodets, Literally meaning "of different descent/nation", "of foreign (alien) origin") was a special ethnicity-based category of population. Informally, the term referred to non-Russian population of the empire (other than the triune Russian nation of Great Russians, Little Russians, Byelorussians). In strict legal sense, it referred to certain indigenous ethnicities of non-European descent specifically listed in the corresponding code of law.

The term is sometimes translated as allogeneous (people) (cf. "allogenes") and sometimes as "aliens". The latter translation is misleading since in most cases the term was applied to the indigenous population of Siberia, Central Asia, and Russian Far East.

Initially, a legal statute was introduced for special treatment of certain peoples of Russia (including a certain degree of protection for their traditional life) for which some laws of the empire were deemed inappropriate. Over time, the term acquired a pejorative connotation of "lacking culture, uncivilized peoples". Privileges and special treatment for inorodtsy varied depending on the group, area, and time period, but often included exemption of military service, reduction or exemption of taxes, protection of grazing lands, and religious and governmental self-administration.

References

Pejorative terms for in-group non-members
Ethnic groups in Russia
Law in the Russian Empire
Society of the Russian Empire